Austrosticta is a genus of damselflies belonging to the family Isostictidae.
It is endemic to northern Australia.
Species of Austrosticta are medium-sized damselflies, dull grey-brown in colour.

Species 
The genus Austrosticta includes the following species:

Austrosticta fieldi  
Austrosticta frater  
Austrosticta soror

References

Isostictidae
Zygoptera genera
Odonata of Australia
Endemic fauna of Australia
Taxa named by Robert John Tillyard
Insects described in 1908
Damselflies